Candover may refer to:
Candover Brook, Hampshire, England
The Candovers, civil parish in Hampshire, comprising
Brown Candover
Chilton Candover
Preston Candover
Candover Clinic, Hampshire
Candover Investments, private equity firm